David Salzer Broder (September 11, 1929March 9, 2011) was an American journalist, writing for The Washington Post for over 40 years. He was also an author, television news show pundit, and university lecturer.

For more than half a century, Broder reported on every presidential campaign, beginning with the 1956 United States presidential election between Dwight D. Eisenhower and Adlai Stevenson II. Known as the dean of the Washington, D.C. press corps, Broder made over 400 appearances on NBC's Meet the Press. The Forbes Media Guide Five Hundred, 1994 stated in 1994: "Broder is the best of an almost extinct species, the daily news reporter who doubles as an op-ed page columnist....With his solid reporting and shrewd analysis, Broder remains one of the sager voices in Washington."

Early life and education 

David Salzer Broder was born to a Jewish family in Chicago Heights, Illinois, the son of Albert "Doc" Broder, a dentist, and Nina Salzer Broder.

He earned a bachelor's degree in liberal arts from the University of Chicago in 1947 and continued his studies there, receiving a master's degree in political science in 1951. While at Chicago, he met fellow student Ann Creighton Collar, and they were married in Crawfordsville, Indiana, in 1951. They had four sons—George, Joshua, Matthew, and Michael—and seven grandchildren.

Early journalism 

Broder began working as a journalist while pursuing his master's degree, serving as editor of The Chicago Maroon and later at the Hyde Park Herald. He was drafted into the U.S. Army in 1951, where he wrote for the newspaper U.S. Forces Austria (USFA) Sentinel, until he was discharged from the Army in 1953.

In 1953 Broder reported for The Pantagraph in Bloomington, Illinois, covering Livingston and Woodford counties in the central part of the state. From there he moved to the Congressional Quarterly in Washington D.C., in 1955, where he apprenticed under senior reporter Helen Monberg and got his first taste of covering congressional politics. During his four-and-a-half years at CQ, Broder also worked for The New York Times as a freelance writer.

In 1960 Broder joined The Washington Star as a junior political writer covering the presidential election that year between John F. Kennedy and Richard Nixon. During his five years at the Star, he was promoted to a national political news reporter and was a weekly contributor to the paper's op-ed page.

Broder left the Star for The New York Times in 1965, hired by well-known Times political reporter and columnist Tom Wicker to serve in its Washington bureau.

The Washington Post columnist 

After 18 months at The New York Times, Broder moved to The Washington Post, where he would remain for over 40 years, beginning as a reporter and weekly op-ed contributor. Later, he was given a second weekly column. Broder's columns were distributed initially through The Washington Post Wire Service and then later syndicated through The Washington Post Writers Group. More than 300 newspapers carried his columns for many years.

The longtime columnist was informally known as the dean of the Washington press corps and the "unofficial chairman of the board" by national political writers.

In May 2008, Broder accepted a buyout offer from The Washington Post Co., effective January 1, 2009, but continued to write his twice-weekly Post column as a contract employee. In a letter to the publications that ran his column, Broder said: "This change will allow me to focus entirely on the column while freeing up the Post to use its budget for other news-section salaries and expenses."

In June 2008, Ken Silverstein, a columnist at Harper's Magazine, alleged that Broder had accepted free accommodations and thousands of dollars in speaking fees from various business and healthcare groups, in one instance penning an opinion column supporting positions favored by one of the groups. Deborah Howell, The Washington Post's ombudsman at the time, wrote that Broder's acceptance of speaking fees appeared to be a violation of the paper's policy on outside speeches, as was the fact that some of the groups that paid Broder also lobby Congress. Howell pointed out that Broder said "he had cleared his speeches with Milton Coleman, deputy managing editor, or Tom Wilkinson, an assistant managing editor, but neither remembered him mentioning them."

Pulitzer Prize 

Broder won the Pulitzer Prize for Commentary in 1973 and was the recipient of numerous awards and academic honors before and after. In his Pulitzer Prize acceptance speech, Broder said:

Meet the Press and other broadcast media 

For many years Broder appeared on Washington Week, Meet the Press, and other network television and radio news programs. It was announced at the close of August 10, 2008, broadcast of Meet the Press that Broder was celebrating his 400th appearance on that program, on which he first appeared July 7, 1963. He appeared far more often than any other person, other than the program's hosts. The next closest person to Broder was Bob Novak, who had appeared on Meet the Press fewer than 250 times.

Broder was a weekly guest on XM/Sirius Satellite Radio's The Bob Edwards Show starting in October 2004. On the premiere broadcast, Broder was joined by CBS News anchor Walter Cronkite as the program's first guest. Broder also contributed to The Bob Edwards Show as a political commentator.

Lecturer and author 

In 2001 Broder became a lecturer at the University of Maryland's Philip Merrill College of Journalism while continuing to write full-time at The Washington Post. He generally lectured one class a year on politics and the press, the class meeting at the newspaper. Merrill College Dean Thomas Kunkel described Broder as the nation's "most respected political journalist" when he announced Broder's hire. Broder also lectured at Duke University (1987–88).

He is author or co-author of eight books:
 Democracy Derailed: Initiative Campaigns and the Power of Money (Harcourt, 2000) 
 The System: The American Way of Politics at the Breaking Point with Haynes Johnson (Little, Brown and Company, 1996) 
 The Man Who Would be President: Dan Quayle with Bob Woodward (Simon & Schuster, 1992) 
 Behind the Front Page: A Candid Look at How the News Is Made (Simon & Schuster 1987) 
 Changing of the Guard: Power and Leadership in America (Simon & Schuster, 1980) 
 The Party's Over: The Failure of Politics in America (Harper and Row, 1972) 
 The Republican Establishment: The Present and Future of the G.O.P. with Stephen H. Hess (Harper and Row, 1967) 
 The Pursuit of the Presidency 1980 with the staff of The Washington Post (Berkeley Books, 1980) 
 Authored the foreword for The Ticket-Splitter: A New Force in American Politics 1972 Co-Authors: Walter DeVries and V. Lance Tarrance

Death 

Broder died of complications from diabetes on March 9, 2011, at the age of 81. Upon Broder's death, President Barack Obama called him the "most respected and incisive political commentator of his generation".

Criticism 

The New Yorker's political commentator Hendrik Hertzberg called Broder "relentlessly centrist." Frank Rich of The New York Times described Broder as the nation's "bloviator in chief."

While on vacation, Broder would write his column from his retreat on Beaver Island, Michigan. Writing for Slate, Timothy Noah found Broder's attempts to merge national affairs with summertime reflections "mind-bendingly dull." Writing in the Washington City Paper, Jack Shafer felt that Broder managed to merge "the cosmic and common in a stupefying slop of prose."

Depictions in popular culture 

He earned substantial attention in two books chronicling the media's coverage of the 1972 presidential campaign between Richard Nixon and George McGovern, including Timothy Crouse's The Boys on the Bus and Gonzo journalist Hunter S. Thompson's Fear and Loathing: On the Campaign Trail '72.

Broder's work was also cited in two autobiographies by key figures in the history of The Washington Post: Personal History by Post publisher Katharine Graham in 1997 and A Good Life: Newspapering and Other Adventures by Post executive editor Ben Bradlee in 1995. More recently, Broder was included in former Post columnist Dave Kindred's 2010 book on the paper's struggles in the changing media landscape: Morning Miracle: A Great Newspaper Fights for Its Life. Broder is also mentioned in President Bill Clinton's biography First in His Class by David Maraniss.

Broder earned a place in works of fiction, meriting a mention by a White House senior staffer to fictional U.S. president Jed Bartlet (portrayed by actor Martin Sheen) on the NBC-TV series The West Wing, and in Steven Spielberg's 2017 film The Post. In the 2018 film The Front Runner, he is portrayed by John Bedford Lloyd.

Neologism 

The left-wing blogger Atrios, a frequent critic of Broder's work, has coined the term High Broderism:
We normally think of "High Broderism" as the worship of bipartisanship for its own sake, combined with a fake "pox on both their houses" attitude. But in reality, this is just the cover Broder uses for his real agenda, the defense of what he perceives to be "the establishment" at all costs.

Awards and recognition 

 Pulitzer Prize for Commentary, 1973
 4th Estate Award from the National Press Club, 1988
 White Burkett Miller Presidential Award in 1989
 Elijah Parish Lovejoy Award (Colby College), 1990
 National Press Foundation's Distinguished Contributions to Journalism Award, 1992
 Illinois State Society Distinguished Illinoisans Award, 1997
 National Society of Newspaper Columnists Lifetime Achievement Award, 1997
 William Allen White Foundation's Award for Distinguished Achievement in Journalism, 1997
 Honorary Doctor of Political Science, DePauw University, May 18, 2003
 Washingtonian Magazine's 50 Best Journalists, 2005
University of Chicago Alumni Medal, June 2005
 Jefferson-Lincoln Award, Panetta Institute for Public Policy, 2007
 Washingtonian Magazine's 50 Best Journalists 2009
 David S. Broder was inducted as a Laureate of The Lincoln Academy of Illinois and awarded the Order of Lincoln (the State's highest honor) by the Governor of Illinois in 2005 in the area of Communications.

Honorary degrees 

 Honorary Doctor of Laws, Cleveland State University, 1981
 Doctor of Literature, Wittenberg University, 1982
 Doctor of Humane Letters, Yale University, 1984
 Doctor of Humane Letters, Kalamazoo College, 1988
 Honorary Degree, Rider University, 1989
 Honorary Doctor of Laws, Lawrence University, 1989
 Honorary Degree, University of Michigan, 1994
 Doctor of Humane Letters, College of William & Mary, 1995
 Doctor of Journalism, University of Miami, 1999
 Doctor of Humane Letters, Muhlenberg College, 2000
 Honorary Doctor of Political Science, DePauw University, May 18, 2003
 Honorary Degree, Clark University, 2005
 Doctor of Humane Letters, Bryant University, 2006
 Honorary Doctor of Laws, Ball State University, 2006
 Doctor of Humanities, Santa Clara University, 2007
 Honorary Doctor of Humane Letters, Bradley University, May 17, 2008.

References

External links 

 David S. Broder, "Striking out on Egypt and the weather" The Washington Post, February 6, 2011. Final article for The Washington Post.
 David S. Broder at The Washington Post
 Faculty profile at the University of Maryland

1929 births
2011 deaths
American columnists
American male non-fiction writers
American newspaper reporters and correspondents
American political commentators
American political writers
Deaths from diabetes
Duke University faculty
Elijah Parish Lovejoy Award recipients
Jewish American journalists
Journalists from Washington, D.C.
Pulitzer Prize for Commentary winners
The Washington Post people
United States Army soldiers
University of Chicago alumni
University of Maryland, College Park faculty
Writers from Bloomington, Illinois
Writers from Illinois
21st-century American Jews